Egyptian was launched in 1788 in France. She was taken in prize circa 1799 and became a Liverpool-based slave ship. She made two complete voyages in the triangular trade in enslaved people. She was condemned at Jamaica after having delivered her slaves on her third voyage.

Career
Egyptian first appeared in Lloyd's Register (LR), in 1800.

1st slave voyage (1800–1801): Captain John Pince acquired a letter of marque on 23 July 1800. Captain Pince sailed from Liverpool on 7 August 1800. He acquired slaves at Cape Coast Castle, Anomabu, and Winnabeck (Wiamba); Egyptian was reported "all well" at Winnabeck on 9 January 1801, together with another Timperon-owned ship, Riddle, master. She arrived at Kingston with 390 slaves on 9 June 1801. She sailed from Kingston on 24 July, and arrived back at Liverpool on 21 September. 

2nd slave voyage (1804–1805): Captain Thomas Cannell acquired a letter of marque on 13 July 1804. Captain Cannell sailed from Liverpool on 31 July 1804. He acquired slaves at Bonny and arrived at Kingston on 12 January 1805 with 329 slaves. Egyptian sailed from Kingston on 25 March 1805 and arrived back at Liverpool on 6 June. She had left Liverpool with 49 crew members and she had suffered eight crew deaths on her voyage. 

3rd slave voyage (1804–1805): Captain Cannell sailed from Liverpool on 16 August 1805. Egyptian embarked slaves at Bonny. She arrived at Kingston on 29 January 2806 with 392 slaves.

Fate
Lloyd's List reported in June 1806 that Egyptian had been condemned at Kingston. The 1806 volume of the Register of Shipping (RS) carried the annotation "Condemned" by her name.

Citations

1788 ships
Ships built in France
Captured ships
Liverpool slave ships
Age of Sail merchant ships of England